Tero Mikael Järvenpää (born 2 October 1984 in Tampere) is a Finnish javelin thrower. He represents Tampereen Pyrintö on club-level and his coach is his father Pentti Järvenpää.

His personal best throw is 86.68 metres, achieved in July 2008 in Tampere.

Seasonal bests by year
2003 - 80.45
2004 - 80.13
2005 - 84.05
2006 - 84.95
2007 - 84.35
2008 - 86.68
2009 - 82.65
2010 - 83.81
2011 - 80.10

Achievements

References

1984 births
Living people
Sportspeople from Tampere
Finnish male javelin throwers
Athletes (track and field) at the 2008 Summer Olympics
Olympic athletes of Finland
Universiade medalists in athletics (track and field)
Universiade silver medalists for Finland
Medalists at the 2005 Summer Universiade
20th-century Finnish people
21st-century Finnish people